Martikavati (alias Matika, Matrika, Matrikavati) was mentioned as the capital of Salwa Kingdom in the epic Mahabharata. Salwa king who attacked Dwaraka was from Martikavati. The son of Kritavarma (the Bhoja-Yadava hero) was established in the city of Martikavata by king Yudhishthira (Mahabharata 16:7). Its location is unknown.

References

Ancient Indian cities